Oriented is a 2015 Israeli-British documentary film directed by Jake Witzenfeld. The film follows the lives of three gay Palestinians living in Tel Aviv over a 15-month period. It is Witzenfeld's first feature documentary. The film premiered at Sheffield Doc/Fest in June 2015.

Cast
Naeem Jiryes as himself
Nagham Yacoub as herself
Fadi Daem as himself
Khader Abu-Seif as himself

Reception
Amara McLaughlin wrote for Moment that the film is "an intercultural revolution that traverses geography, nationality, religion, sexual orientation and migration."

References

External links

Official website

2015 documentary films
2015 films
Documentary films about gay men
Israeli documentary films
Israeli LGBT-related films
Films set in Tel Aviv
LGBT culture in Tel Aviv
2015 LGBT-related films